David Anaclethe Emma (born January 14, 1969) is an American former ice hockey player. Emma won the Hobey Baker Award in 1991 playing for Boston College. Emma would go on to play professionally in the National Hockey League for the New Jersey Devils, Boston Bruins, and Florida Panthers. , he is a wealth management advisor for Masterson, Emma & Associates.

Emma attended Bishop Hendricken High School. He later attended Boston College where he was named an All-American and selected for All-Hockey East Teams during his four year career.

Internationally, Emma has represented the United States at the 1992 Winter Olympics and Ice Hockey World Championships. Emma was inducted into the Rhode Island Hockey Hall of Fame in 2019.

Awards and honors

Career statistics

Regular season and playoffs

International

References

External links
 

1969 births
Living people
Bishop Hendricken High School alumni
Albany River Rats players
American men's ice hockey right wingers
American people of Italian descent
Boston Bruins players
Boston College Eagles men's ice hockey players
Florida Panthers players
Hobey Baker Award winners
Ice hockey players from Rhode Island
Sportspeople from Cranston, Rhode Island
Ice hockey players at the 1992 Winter Olympics
Louisville Panthers players
New Jersey Devils draft picks
New Jersey Devils players
Olympic ice hockey players of the United States
Phoenix Roadrunners (IHL) players
Utica Devils players
AHCA Division I men's ice hockey All-Americans